A push-down is a strength training exercise used for strengthening the triceps muscles in the back of the arm.  

The exercise is completed by pushing an object downward against resistance. This exercise is an example of the primary function of the triceps, extension of the elbow joint.

Weight training exercises